Samira Azer gizi Efendiyeva (born 17 April 1991), known as Samira Efendi or Efendi, is an Azerbaijani singer. She represented Azerbaijan in the Eurovision Song Contest 2021 with the song "Mata Hari".

Career

Early career
Efendiyeva gained popularity in her home country after participating in the singing competitions Yeni Ulduz (2009), Böyük Səhnə (2014) and The Voice of Azerbaijan (2015-2016, third place). In 2017, she was the Azerbaijani representative in the international singing competition Silk Way Star, staged in Almaty, Kazakhstan, finishing in third place. Efendiyeva represented her country again at the Voice of Nur-Sultan festival held in Nur-Sultan, Kazakhstan in 2019.

In 2014, she participated in Azerbaijan's national selection for the Eurovision Song Contest but was eliminated at the third heat of the competition.

2020–present: Eurovision Song Contest
On 28 February 2020, the Azerbaijani broadcaster İTV announced that Efendiyeva had been internally selected to represent Azerbaijan in the Eurovision Song Contest 2020 with the song "Cleopatra", held in Rotterdam, Netherlands. However, the contest was cancelled on 18 March 2020 due to the COVID-19 pandemic. She instead represented Azerbaijan in the Eurovision Song Contest 2021 with the song "Mata Hari". Efendi qualified to the final, where she ended up in 20th place out of 26 countries, receiving 65 points.

During her time at the Eurovision Song Contest, she would gain publicity after the Norwegian singer that had been selected to go to the contest, Andreas Haukeland, otherwise known as Tix had shown a noticeable crush on Efendi throughout their time at Eurovision through a variety of ways, including giving gifts, flirting on social media, asking Efendi out on dates, and singing love songs (including a couple parodies, Tix's own song Fallen Angel and the Pokémon Indigo League theme song). In response, she would do the same, including releasing a new music video and song dedicated to Tix that was posted by Eurovision's YouTube account. Some have accused Tix of fabricating the crush as a ploy to gain televotes from Azerbaijan, however Tix maintains that the crush is real and not for PR. Some others would create fan art, memes, and spread moments of the two recorded online on social media. A ship name was created, with it being called "Efentix." Tix would eventually qualify, finishing in tenth, five points ahead of the next opponent. Azerbaijan would give 10 points to Norway in the semi final. It is unclear whether they are in a relationship, however Efendi has been reported to have been thinking of potentially marrying Haukeland. Samira would say of the relationship "To be honest, at first I was not serious about the attention of the Norwegian representative Tix. I didn’t understand what was happening. I went to Eurovision to win, not to meet someone. I went there with completely different thoughts, but received a gift from fate."

Personal life
Efendi has been rumored to have been dating Norwegian russ music artist Andreas Haukeland, otherwise known by his artist name, Tix. While speaking to Sputnik Azerbaijan, she talked about potentially marrying Haukeland, and saying that she would move to Norway to be with him, saying (translated to English) "If I get married, I’ll probably move to Norway. Where the husband is, there I am."

Efendi has practiced pole dancing for a number of years. In her spare time, she runs her own sweets boutique, called Efendi Sweet. The online Instagram store sells a variety of sweets, including cakes and éclairs.

Discography

Singles

References

1991 births
21st-century Azerbaijani women singers
Azerbaijani women pop singers
Eurovision Song Contest entrants for Azerbaijan
Eurovision Song Contest entrants of 2020
Eurovision Song Contest entrants of 2021
Living people
Musicians from Baku
The Voice (franchise) contestants
Confectioners